John F. Williams (1887–1953) was an American army officer.

John F. Williams may also refer to:
 John F. Williams (American politician) (1885–1963), American politician
 John Ffowcs Williams (1935–2020), Welsh engineer
 John Foster Williams (1743–1814), American naval officer
 John Francis Williams (percussionist) or Johnny Williams (1905–1985), American percussionist
 John Francon Williams (1854–1911), Welsh writer
 John Frederick Williams (priest) (1907–1983), Welsh Anglican priest
 John Frederick Williams (rugby) or Jack Williams (1882–1911), Welsh rugby player

See also 
 John Williams (disambiguation)